A trumeau is the central pillar or mullion supporting the tympanum of a large doorway, commonly found in medieval buildings. An architectural feature, it is often sculpted.  Monolithic or paired, it becomes sculpted or decorated in Romanesque architecture, whose architectural invention consisted in animating the structure of the door, at the same time as Romanesque artists imagined compound pillars and double scrolled arcades, in the second quarter of the 11th century.

Gallery

See also
 Jamb statue

References

External links

__notoc__

Architectural sculpture
Columns and entablature